Mons Ivar Mjelde (born 17 November 1967) is a Norwegian footballer coach and former player who works as head coach for the Norwegian club Øygarden.

He is notable for having led Brann to the Norwegian top division championship in 2007, breaking the widely supported team's notorious spell of 44 years without a league title. As a player, he was a prolific goalscorer both in the Norwegian top division and the Austrian Bundesliga. He also won three caps for Norway, scoring two goals.

Mjelde has won the Kniksen award both as a player and as a head coach.

Playing career
Mjelde was born in Osterøy. During his active career, He spent two seasons at Austria Wien, two and a half seasons at Lillestrøm and a total of seven seasons at Brann. He also played one season in Bryne – before he went to Lillestrøm. Towards the end of his career, he was loaned out to Sogndal in 2001. Mjelde scored 72 goals in 160 matches for Brann, earning himself and the team silver medals in 1997 and 2000, bronze medals and a cup silver as losing finalists in 1999 and an advancement to the quarter final in the Cup Winners' Cup in 1997, in which they were eliminated by Liverpool. After returning to Brann from Austria in 1996, Mjelde scored 19 goals in 15 league appearances, earning him the Kniksen award as "striker of the year". Mons Ivar played three games and scored two goals for Norway.

Coaching career
His first four years as a head coach saw Mjelde win both the league and the cup in Norway. Retiring as a player after the 2001 season, Mjelde became the new coach for Brann's reserve team in the Norwegian Second Division. The year after, Brann's head coach, Teitur Thordarson left the club. In January 2003, after only one year's experience as a coach, Mons Ivar Mjelde was appointed head coach in SK Brann. The season resulted in Brann finishing 6th, a major improvement from the previous year. The following year he guided Brann to a bronze medal in the premiership. They also won the cup, the first trophy in 22 years.

In the 2005 season, Brann finished 6th. 2006 was a better season for Mjelde and Brann, who finished as runners-up to Rosenborg. In 2007, his coaching career hit new heights as he took Brann to their first league title in 44 years, six points ahead of Stabæk. On 7 October 2008, Mons Ivar Mjelde announced that the 2008 season would conclude his spell in Brann.

Mjelde was officially appointed as head coach for Bryne on 1 June 2009. In 2011, he coached Valestrand Hjellvik for two games before being snapped up by Start. He was hired as head coach of Start halfway through the 2011 season, but could not save the team from relegation. The next season, Start won the Adeccoligaen and consequently promotion to the top flight in the 2012 season.

In December 2016, Mjelde was appointed as head coach for Åsane IL, a Norwegian First Division team from Bergen. The parts separate ways, after the club was relegated in 2018.

In September 2020, Mjelde was appointed as head coach for Øygarden FK.

Career statistics

Managerial statistics
All competitive league games (league and domestic cup) and international matches (including friendlies) are included.

Honours

Player
Individual
Norwegian top division top scorer: 1993
Kniksen Award: Striker of the Year in 1996

Head coach
Brann
Norwegian Cup: 2004
Tippeligaen: 2007
Kniksen Award: Coach of the Year in 2007

References

1967 births
Living people
People from Osterøy
Norwegian footballers
Association football forwards
Norway international footballers
Bryne FK players
Lillestrøm SK players
FK Austria Wien players
SK Brann players
Sogndal Fotball players
Eliteserien players
Austrian Football Bundesliga players
Kniksen Award winners
Norwegian football managers
SK Brann managers
Bryne FK managers
IK Start managers
Fredrikstad FK managers
Åsane Fotball managers
Norwegian expatriate footballers
Expatriate footballers in Austria
Norwegian expatriate sportspeople in Austria
Sportspeople from Vestland